In museums, the collection of cultural property or material is normally catalogued in a collection catalog (or collections catalog). Traditionally this was done using a card index, but nowadays it is normally implemented using a computerized database (known as a collection database) and may even be made available online.

See also 
 Library catalog, the corresponding term in library science
 Calendar (archive) and Finding aid, the corresponding terms in archival science
 Inventory (museum)
 Inventory (library and archival science)

External links 
 The UCMP Collections Catalog from the University of California Museum of Paleontology
 LACMA's online collection: Access to more than 60,000 artworks from the Los Angeles County Museum of Art's permanent collection. 

Collections care
Conservation and restoration of cultural heritage
Archival science
Museology